Elman Sports Club is a Somali sports club based in the Wadajir district of Mogadishu. It is best known for  football team, which competes in the top level of Somali Premier League, Locally, it is known primarily by the nickname "The Yellows", which represents to "The Colour of team". It is known as the best team in Somalia, It is the most successful sports club in the country, and holds a national record of 15 official football trophies, Six Title of Somali Premier League, tree Somali General Daoud Cups, Five Somali Super Cups and One Somali Stars League.

The origin of the club was founded in 1996 by a group of youth sports members Lead by Mr. Abdirashid Hajji Nor,the first President of Elman sports club.

Achievements

Somali Premier League
2054
-2004, 2010-2011, 2011-2012
Somali Super Cup
18
Somali General Daud Cup
Champions (2) 1999-2000, 2017-2018Somali Stars League'''
champions (1): 2017-2018

Stadium
Elman SC play their matches at Jaamacadaha Stadium which is located in Hodan district, It is a multi-purpose stadium Originally Owned by Somali National University and Built by FIFA. featuring for  football  field, a gym and Players Camp among other facilities. 
The stadium has a capacity of 15,000 seats. Besides local football matches, the stadium also hosts a number of tournaments such as Somali Demotic Youth League   and some of the Somali Division Leagues.

Technical staff

Managerial history
Osman Hassan Omar 1996-1997 
Zakariya Mohamud 1997-1999
Abukar Islow Mohamed 	1999-2000
Abey haji Abukar	2000
Abdi Farah Geele	2000-2005
Awil Hassan	2005-2006
Abdi Farah Geele	2006-2009
Mohamed Abulle Farayare	2009-2010
Yusuf Ali Nur(YuuCali ) 	2010-2014
Mohamed Abdulle Farayare	2014-2015
Ali Adan elmi (Ali Koorey )	2015
Issa Roberto Mayanja	2016
Abdiwali Mohamed Mohamud 	2017
Abdirahaman Ahmed (Macalin Taree)	2018
Al Haji Abuubakar	2019
Issa Roberto Mayanja 	2020
Muraad Abdulkadir Mohamoud 	2020-2021
Ahmed Abdirahman Omar Current

Players

Senior Squad

References

External links
 Elman FC Website

Elman FC
Football clubs in Somalia
1993 establishments in Somalia